The Inter-Cooperative Agricultural Confederation (or CONIAGRO) is an Argentine organization that gathers several agricultural cooperatives around the country.

History
The decade of 1880s saw an increase in the agricultural economy of Argentina, thanks to the great European immigration wave to Argentina. The immigrants helped to build infrastructure including granaries, roads, railways, ports. The first cooperative, "El Progreso Agrícola", was established in 1898, in the south of the Buenos Aires province. Several French immigrants united to seek ways to counter the risk of hails to the agriculture. Several other cooperatives followed in other regions of the country, focused on the needs of each region. 

The cooperatives then organized in federations that represented the interests of several cooperatives. The "Confederación Entrerriana de Cooperativas", in the Entre Ríos Province, was the first provincial federation, established in 1913. The first national organization was the "Consejo Intercooperativo Agrario de Coordinación y Arbitraje", established in 1953, during the presidency of Juan Perón. Other cooperatives that were not part of it joined it in 1958. 

Nowadays, there are nearly a thousand cooperatives, organized in more than a dozen of second-level federations. Their combined annual exports grow near 3,000 millions of Argentine pesos.

Bibliography

References

Agricultural organisations based in Argentina